Brian Christopher Brett (1938-2006) was a speedway rider from England.

Speedway career 
Brett reached the final of the Speedway World Championship in the 1965 Individual Speedway World Championship.

He rode in the top tier of British Speedway from 1956 to 1967, riding for various clubs. He was capped by England three times and Great Britain four times.

World final appearances

Individual World Championship
 1965 –  London, Wembley Stadium – 6th – 9pts

World Team Cup
 1964 -  Abensberg, Abensberg Stadion (with Barry Briggs / Ron How / Ken McKinlay / Nigel Boocock) - 3rd - 21pts (0)

References 

1938 births
2006 deaths
British speedway riders
Cradley Heathens riders
Ipswich Witches riders
Newcastle Diamonds riders
Rye House Rockets riders
Southampton Saints riders
Swindon Robins riders